Georgi Doykov (born 3 April 1924) was a Bulgarian cross-country skier. He competed in the men's 18 kilometre event at the 1948 Winter Olympics.

References

External links
 

1924 births
Possibly living people
Bulgarian male cross-country skiers
Olympic cross-country skiers of Bulgaria
Cross-country skiers at the 1948 Winter Olympics
Place of birth missing